Ethan W. Fernea (born March 2, 1998) is an American football wide receiver for the Indianapolis Colts of the National Football League (NFL).

Early life and education
Fernea was born on March 2, 1998, in Austin, Texas. He attended Dripping Springs High School and was a three-time varsity letter winner in football, where he played on both offense and defense. He earned first-team All-District on both sides of the field and was also a third-team All-Centex selection. Additionally, he played three seasons of baseball, earning All-District and All-Centex honors, and three years of track.

After graduating from high school, Fernea was lightly recruited. Although he received a scholarship offer from Air Force, he declined, stating he wanted to play at a higher level. Near Christmas 2015, Fernea's father and uncle visited a friend who was the father of Robbie Paton, a UCLA recruiter. They showed highlights of Fernea to him, and the tape eventually made its way to the UCLA staff, which offered Fernea a chance to make the team as a walk-on.

Fernea made the team but was "buried" on the depth chart, only seeing action on special teams. He appeared in one game as a true freshman in 2016 and eight games for the team in 2017, before playing in all 12 matches in 2018. He began seeing his first action on offense in 2018 and made two receptions.

Fernea was given a scholarship for the 2019 season, having impressed the coach in the prior year, despite having suffered a broken leg in the spring camp. He recovered, and in the fall, was given the number 36, a tribute to Nick Pasquale (c. 1993–2013), who had been considered a great teammate. In a game against Colorado, Fernea caught a 45-yard touchdown, the first score of his college career. He finished the season having appeared in all 12 games with two starts (against Colorado and Utah).

In 2020, Fernea's position was changed from wide receiver to running back. In a game against USC, he recorded a 33-yard receiving touchdown. He finished the season with six games played and one special teams tackle, while having the highest yards-per-catch average on the team for players with more than one reception. Fernea was given an extra year of eligibility due to the COVID-19 pandemic in 2021, and opted to return to the team. He finished his final season of college football with 11 games played and 10 rushes for 82 yards and one touchdown. At the end of the year, he was given the Tommy Prothro Award for "excellence on special teams."

Professional career
After going unselected in the 2022 NFL Draft, Fernea was signed by the Indianapolis Colts as an undrafted free agent. He converted to wide receiver in training camp, but had an insignificant impact in preseason and was waived at the final roster cuts, on August 30. However, one day after being released, Fernea was re-signed to the Colts' practice squad. He was activated from the practice squad for the team's week seven game against the Tennessee Titans, and made his NFL debut in the 10–19 loss, appearing on 10 combined offense and special teams snaps. He signed a reserve/future contract on January 27, 2023.

References

1998 births
Living people
American football wide receivers
American football running backs
Players of American football from Austin, Texas
UCLA Bruins football players
Indianapolis Colts players